This is the discography of American soul singer Jimmy Ruffin.

Albums

Studio albums

Compilation albums

Singles

Notes

References

Discographies of American artists
Soul music discographies
Rhythm and blues discographies